Melinda Cleland (born 15 October 1984) is an Australian gymnast. She competed at the 2000 Summer Olympics.

References

External links
 

1984 births
Living people
Australian female artistic gymnasts
Olympic gymnasts of Australia
Gymnasts at the 2000 Summer Olympics
Sportspeople from Melbourne
People from Frankston, Victoria
Sportswomen from Victoria (Australia)